Rosslynlee railway station served the village of Roslin, Midlothian, Scotland from 1855 to 1962 on the Peebles Railway.

History 
The station opened on 4 July 1855 by the Peebles Railway. The station was situated on the north side of an unnamed minor road. The station was originally planned to be named Kirkstall, but it was named Roslin. It was renamed Rosslyn in June 1864 and finally renamed Rosslynlee on 2 September 1872 to avoid confusion with the station of the same name. There was a small goods yard behind the single platform, which consisted of one siding running into a dock. This closed on 3 August 1959 although a private siding remained in use after that. The station was closed to both passengers and goods traffic on 5 February 1962.

References

External links 

Disused railway stations in Midlothian
Former North British Railway stations
Railway stations in Great Britain opened in 1855
Railway stations in Great Britain closed in 1917
Railway stations in Great Britain opened in 1919
Railway stations in Great Britain closed in 1962
1855 establishments in Scotland
1962 disestablishments in Scotland